Singam is an Indian Tamil-language action film series centered around the title character Duraisingam, an honest police officer who aims to eliminate corruption from the society. The film series began in 2010 with the release of Singam, directed by Hari and starring Suriya as the titular character. The film received positive reviews and grossed ₹90 crore worldwide. The first film also spawned two direct sequels: Singam II (2013), and Si3 (2017).

Overview

Singam (2010) 

Durai Singam, is the honest police sub inspector of Nallur, assisted by his bumbling colleague Erimalai.  His family business is provision stores and Duraisingam wants to join it, but he joined police due to his father's wishes. He resolves most of the problems in his village with non-violence and mutual counselling. He uses force only when the situation demands it, thereby gaining much reputation and love from the villagers. Mahalingam  is an industrialist in Chennai and a friend of Singam's father. He comes to the village with his beautiful daughter Kavya. Eventually Singam and Kavya fall in love with each other.
Everything seems to be smooth-running until Chennai-based Mayil Vaaganam, a big-time extortionist with shady mafia dealings who blackmails people by complaining to the Income Tax Department, is required to travel to Nallur to sign a conditional bail. He instead, sends one of his allies to do the formalities, much to the anger and rage of Singam who demands Mayil sign the bail in person. Humiliated, Mayil reaches Nallur but is unable to take any revenge on Singam fearing the immense love and devotion of the entire village towards Singam. Using his political contacts, he gets Singam transferred to Chennai to teach him a lesson.
The next part of the movie revolved how Duraisingam overtake problem given by Mail Vaaganam

Singam II (2013) 

Picking up the storyline from where Singam ended, Duraisingam  has gone undercover after meeting the Home Minister and is working as an NCC officer in a school in Thoothukudi. The only people who know about this operation are the Chief Minister and Home Minister apart from himself. Sathya is a student who falls for Duraisingam though he is waiting to marry Kavya, his love interest from the previous film. Susai , a local who works in the same school shows Duraisingam parts of Thoothukudi and also tells him about the rouge elements dominating the area helping him in his surveillance. He requests the Home Minister to transfer Erimalai and another cop for assisting him. Sathya's moves are frequently repulsed by Duraisingam who learns that Sathya is the niece of Thangaraj. Bhai and Thangaraj, are two criminals who control the area. Bhai and Thangaraj have connections with an international gangster and drug lord Danny. Though they are partners in their smuggling business, they conceal their partnership to the outside world and pretend like arch rivals when they are out in the public. How Duraisingam overcomes the criminals, brings down their empire and finally unites with Kavya forms the crux of the story.

Si3 (2017) 

The film starts with tremble in Andhra Pradesh assembly where long pending murder case of city commissioner Ramakrishna is being discussed where home minister K. Satyanarayana proposes to bring DCP Durai Singam from Tamil Nadu police to solve the long pending case. Initially being attacked by Madhusudhana Reddy's  men at railway station at arrival Durai Singam bashes them out and joins the Visakhapatnam police force under CBI pretending to be casual and not serious about the murder case Durai Singam secretly investigates the case from all aspects. Meanwhile, Durai Singam is being followed by Vidhya  whom is a journalist from Andhra Pradesh tracking Durai Singam in disguise as student applied for IPS exams. Durai Singam initially says divorced his wife Kavya, but secretly contacts her. Later, after suspicion of Subba Rao it is told to be play to avoid Kavya from attacks from suspects of murder case. But, finally finding Reddy is behind the murder in series of investigation decides to wipe out goondas in Vispakhapatnam along with arresting Police officers involved in murder of commissioner. After, tracking a suspect he come across to know illegal dumping of Bio-waste and E-Waste from Australia by Vittal Prasad a wealthy politician and businessman from Australia and son of central minster Ram Prasad who works as master mind behind dumping of Wates from Australia in Vishakhapatnam by help of Reddy and his staff Rajeev Krishna . When the commissioner tried to expose this to media he was brutally killed by Reddy and his subordinates. This is proved by witness from commissioner's driver Mallaya and school teacher who lost his granddaughter in toxic smoke caused by burning wastes from Australia in nearby dumpyard. When Durai Singam attempts to arrest Reddy and Vittal Prasad with help the witness and evidence collected. But, Reddy's men kills the school teacher and warns Durai Singam that he destroy his whole family from Australia if he further investigates the case. Vittal tries to escape through plane but Durai Singam stops him and takes him to Talakona forest and kills him there.

Singam 4 
Shortly after the release of Si3, Suriya confirmed that he and Hari would return for a fourth film in the series in future.

Films

Singam

The first installment of the series, centers on the fictional incidents. Narasimha is a fearless, honest inspector in Rajolu. Friction between Purushottam, a dreaded gangster, and Narasimha leads to the latter being transferred to Vizag, where Purushottam rules the roost. Singam was released on 28 May 2010 (worldwide) and gained positive reviews.It earned ₹90 crore worldwide  against a budget of ₹15 crore, becoming the fifth highest grossing film in Indian history (2010).

Singam 2

After the success of Singam Hari and Suriya Re-unite once again for sequel. The film was titled as Singam 2 and also second installment in this series. The plot focused on Duraisingam, an undercover police officer, works in a school in Tamil Nadu and tries to put an end to the criminal activities of Bhai and Thangaraj who rule the area. Singam II released in about 1500 screens worldwide, one of the largest releases for a Tamil film. The film released in a record 151 screens in Kerala and 63 screens in USA.
The film's Telugu version was distributed by K. E. Gnanavel Raja's Studio Green. It received positive reviews upon release. Critics particularly praised the performances of Suriya, Hansika Motwani and Anushka Shetty. However, Forbes stated that the film made 1.36 billion in its lifetime.

Si3

A sequel, Si3, was commissioned after the success of the previous film and was also directed by Hari, with both Suriya and Anushka reprising their roles and Shruti Hassan in a cameo role. The film focused on a case A police chief is tasked with solving the murder case of the police commissioner. When he finds out that a powerful gangster is responsible for it, he decides to end the latter's tyrannical reign. It was released on 9 February 2017 to positive reviews from both critics and audiences; some stated that "Durai Singam strikes again! Suriya and Hari don't disappoint you in this Singam franchise". Proving to be similarly successful to the first entry in the series, the film became another profitable addition to the franchise, having earned ₹110 crore. worldwide from a budget of ₹65 crore. And becoming the fifth highest-grossing film of 2017.

Future films

Si4
Shortly after the release of Si3, Suriya confirmed that he and Hari would return for a fourth film in the series in future.

Recurring cast and characters 
This table lists the main characters who appear in the Singam Franchise.

Additional crew and production details

Release and revenue

Box office performance
The franchise has been notable for its profit, with Singam and its follow-up having earned a combined profit of ₹325 crore, according to IBtimes.

Reception 
Sify described the film Singam as a "predictable entertainer that follows the age old formula", while Suriya "carries the film to the winning post. His passion and the way he brings an ordinary regular larger-than-life hero character alive on screen is lesson for other commercial heroes". Rediff.com felt it was an "unapologetic... entertainer and has Suriya in every frame. Lovers of commercial potpourri will definitely get their money's worth." The film was the third highest-grossing Tamil film of 2010, earning more than 5.38 crore in Chennai alone. In Malaysia, the film collected $1,471,508 and $12,956 in United Kingdom.

With regard to Singam II, Rediff.com felt "the film has a lot of power-packed action sequences and the story races along with a tremendous pace keeping you engaged throughout... The only negative would be the length – the movie runs for almost three hours. A slightly shorter version would have created a greater impact". Deccan Chronicle gave it the verdict: "Even if you are not a Suriya fan, Singam 2 is worth a watch. The film roars rather well." In contrast, Zee News felt, "Suriya is the only character that makes you feel satisfied in the entire movie". Singam II had a sold-out opening with as much as 95–100% occupancy. According to Sify, the film stayed inside the top five positions at Chennai box office continuously for eight weeks after its release and was declared a 'Superhit'.

Reviewing Si3, The Times of India lauded Suriya and Hari, writing,"[His] consistency in handling cop stories convincingly and entertainingly needs to be commended as he has been proving his expertise repeatedly". The New Indian Express similarly praised Suriya, but found "as a commercial film director, [Hari's] storytelling methods also suffer from following a set of rules, which include frequent yawn-inducing songs". In contrast,The Hindu felt it was "loud, fast, and without a single memorable moment". Likewise, Sify called the film "a cocktail of harebrained predictable plot, exhausting action scenes and slapstick comedy". It collected  worldwide in 6 days.

In other media 
Soori imitated the character of Durai Singam in Varuthapadatha Valibar Sangam (2013). After, he play Veera Babu in Si3. Santhanam also parodied the character in Vellore Maavattam (2011).

References

External links 
 
 
 

 
Indian film series
Action film series